Essington Rugby Union Football Club is an English rugby union club that plays in the Midlands Division in the Midlands 4 West (North) league.  The club was formed in 1998 as a merger between 3 local sides - Old Oaks, Rubery Owen and Wulfrun.

2007 - 2008 Season

The 2007-2008 season saw Essington reach their first ever cup final.
 
Staffordshire Cup

Club Honours
Staffordshire 2 champions: 1989–90
North Midlands 3 champions: 1994–95
Midlands 5 West (North) champions (2): 2008–09, 2015–16
Staffordshire Rubery Owen Cup winners (2): 2012, 2015

Notes

References

External links
  Essington Rugby Union Football Club

English rugby union teams
Rugby clubs established in 1998
Rugby union in Staffordshire
1998 establishments in England